The 1926–27 Connecticut Aggies men's basketball team represented Connecticut Agricultural College, now the University of Connecticut, in the 1926–27 collegiate men's basketball season. The Aggies completed the season with a 9–7 overall record. The Aggies were members of the New England Conference, where they ended the season with a 3–2 record. The Aggies played their home games at Hawley Armory in Storrs, Connecticut, and were led by fourth-year head coach Sumner A. Dole.

Schedule 

|-
!colspan=12 style=""| Regular Season

Schedule Source:

References 

UConn Huskies men's basketball seasons
Connecticut
1926 in sports in Connecticut
1927 in sports in Connecticut